Dancing in the Street: The Songs of Motown II is the sixth studio album by Australian pop vocal group Human Nature and second Motown covers release. It was released on 14 October 2006.

Reception

AllMusic's brief review said that the album achieved "a nice balance between updating the classic Motown sound for contemporary dance-pop fans while still remaining faithful to the original recordings."

Track listing 
"Dancing in the Street" (Marvin Gaye, William "Mickey" Stevenson, Ivy Jo Hunter) – 2:56
"Ain't No Mountain High Enough" (Nickolas Ashford, Valerie Simpson) – 2:44
"ABC" (Berry Gordy, Jr., Alphonso Mizell, Freddie Perren, Deke Richards) – 3:02
"Signed, Sealed, Delivered I'm Yours" (Stevie Wonder, Lee Garrett, Syreeta Wright, Lula Mae Hardaway) – 3:04
"You Can't Hurry Love" (Holland-Dozier-Holland) – 3:04
"Ain't Too Proud to Beg" (Norman Whitfield, Edward Holland, Jr.) – 2:56
"What's Going On" (Al Cleveland, Renaldo Benson, Marvin Gaye) – 3:52
"Uptight (Everything's Alright)" (Stevie Wonder, Sylvia Moy, Henry Cosby) – 3:11
"Please Mr. Postman" (Georgia Dobbins, William Garrett, Brian Holland, Robert Bateman, Freddie Gorman) – 2:48
"I Can't Get Next to You" (Norman Whitfield, Barrett Strong) – 2:54
"Midnight Train to Georgia" (Jim Weatherly) – 4:34
"I Can't Help Myself (Sugar Pie, Honey Bunch)" (Holland-Dozier-Holland) – 2:44
"What Becomes of the Broken Hearted" (William Weatherspoon, Paul Riser, James Dean) – 3:42
"Just My Imagination (Running Away With Me)" (Whitfield, Strong) – 3:46

Personnel 
Glenn A. Baker – Liner Notes
Ian Bell – Trombone
Jessica Bell – Violin
Grecco Buratto – Guitar
Paul Bushnell – Bass
David Caplice – Management
David Champion – Management
David Paul Jr. Collins – A&R
Kieran Conrau – Trombone
Jim Cox – Keyboards
Tom Coyne – Mastering
Shane Gillard – Trumpet
Cameron Hill – Violin
Hilbert Ho – Art Direction, Design
Rachel Homburg – Violin
Edwina Hookey – Violin
Hannah Hookey – String Coordinator
Helen Ireland – Viola
Christina Katsimbardis – Violin
Kylie Liang – Violin
Benjamin Northey – Flute, Sax (Baritone), Sax (Soprano), String Arrangements, Brass Arrangement
Michael Brooks Reid – Violin
Forrester Savell – Bass Engineer, Drum Engineering
Rafael Serrano – Assistant Engineer
Gregg Spence – Trumpet
Jay Dee Springbett – A&R
Dave Way – Mixing
Paul L. Wiltshire – Keyboards, Producer
Jonathan Wong – Violin
Victoria Wu – Producer, Vocal Editing

Charts

Certifications

References

External links
 Human Nature web page

Human Nature (band) albums
2006 albums
Sony BMG albums
Columbia Records albums
Motown cover albums
Sequel albums